Ritchey may refer to:

Places
 Ritchey, California
 Ritchey, Missouri

People
 George Willis Ritchey (1864–1945), American optician, telescope maker and astronomer
 Tom Ritchey (born 1956), American bike designer

Other uses
 Ritchey (lunar crater)
 Ritchey (Martian crater)
 Ritchey Design